The Long Road Out of Eden Tour was a worldwide concert tour by the Eagles, whose beginning coincided with the release of their 2007 album Long Road Out of Eden. The tour began in London, at The O2 arena on March 20, 2008, and ended on November 19, 2011 with a show at the MGM Grand Garden Arena in Las Vegas. In 2010, the Eagles toured alongside the Dixie Chicks, with Keith Urban appearing at selected shows. The tour changed its name to the Eagles 2010 Summer Tour. That leg of the tour focused on stadium shows, such as in Winnipeg and Toronto and New Jersey. The December 2010 Eagles tour of Australia was packaged as Eagles Summer 2010.

Tour dates

Notes

See also 
 List of highest-grossing concert tours

References

External links
 Piao.com
 Piao.com

2008 concert tours
2009 concert tours
2010 concert tours
2011 concert tours
Eagles (band)